George Thomas Robinson FSA (c.1827 - 6 May 1897) was an English architect who started in Wolverhampton, moved to Manchester, Leamington Spa and later to London.

Life

He was a pupil of John R. Hamilton and James Medland. He started his own practice in 1848 and worked in partnership with Henry John Paull as the firm of Paull and Robinson. He was appointed architect of the Coventry Archidiaconal Church Extension Society.

He was also a journalist and art critic for the Manchester Guardian. He was in Metz during the siege of the city in the Franco-Prussian War in 1870, and attempted to send messages to his editor by attaching them to balloons.

He died on 6 May 1897 at his home, 20 Earls Terrace, Kensington.

Works

Wolverhampton Baths, Bath Street 1849 - 1850
Christ Church, Gailey 1849 - 1851 
St James’ Church, Brownhills 1850 - 1851
Wolverhampton Corn Exchange 1850 - 1853
St John’s Church, Bishopswood 1851
Bolton Market Hall 1855
Old Town Hall, Burslem, Stoke-on-Trent 1852 - 1857

Monument to Cleophas Ratliff, Coventry Cemetery 1858
Memorial to J. Howells, Holy Trinity Church, Coventry 1859
St Patrick, Salter Street, Earlswood, west tower. 1860
St Luke's Church, Blakenhall, Wolverhampton 1860 - 1861
St James’ Church, Bulkington, chancel arch and organ chamber arch 1865
Milverton Lawn (now The Sunshine Home), Warwick New Road, Leamington Spa, Warwickshire 1860 - 1870
East side of Cadogan Square 1879
Esher Place, Surrey 1890s

References

1827 births
1897 deaths
The Guardian journalists
19th-century English architects
Architects from Staffordshire